Feteira is a civil parish in the southern part of the municipality of Horta, on the island of Faial in the Portuguese archipelago of the Azores. The population in 2011 was 1,899, in an area of 14.46 km². It occupies the southern foothills of the Caldeira Volcano, along the coast. The name Feteira is derived from the Portuguese word for "fern", and indicates a "location of [many] ferns"; the name likely refers to the original colonists' discovery of this area covered with ferns.

History
The early inhabitants colonized the area around Ribeira da Granja, along the coast near Lajinha and Ponta Furada.  They built their first community along the coast, although on higher ground.

The Church of Feteira, consecrated in honor of the Holy Spirit, is one of the older churches on the island.  Lost to history, its date of construction is currently unknown, although the first references to the sanctuary refer to 1562. In that Year,  the local residents were forced to pay higher taxes to the parish.  On June 30, 1568, King D. Sebastião passed a provision in favor of People of Feteira who sought the Crown's intervention. Relating to its church, the historian Gaspar Frutuoso mentioned  that it had three naves, supported by five columns, with arterial chapels on either side.  It was a temple of good proportions (35 m in width) with a single bell-tower. The parish also had a nearby 15th century chapel dedicated to Saint Peter. In 1597, it was sacked and burned by English pirates.  The chapel was a place of pilgrimage and popular religious festivities. Due to lack of attention and care, over time it was abandoned. 
Because of a history of piracy, there were small forts along the rugged coastline for the protection of the residents. They were part of an overall system of defenses around the island of Fayal, which suffered most of the time from lack of sufficient manpower and artillery. These fortified outposts decayed with time and the erosive action of the sea and tempests. Today, the ruins of these defensive positions have disappeared.

Following economic and social hardship in 1862, and weakness of political leaders to satisfy their demands, an uprising occurred in 1862 in several of the island's towns over the imposition of new taxes. The people of Feteirs adhered to the protests.

Geography

Farmlands dominate the coastal plain between the neighbouring parishes of Angústias and Castelo Branco, while the coast is a rocky area formed by rugged lava stones and cliffs undercut by the Atlantic Ocean. Lava flows formed intricate geomorphological structures, highlighted by the area of Lajinha (on the eastern border). Wave motion and currents have carved this region forming coastal arches, and undercutting the E.R. 1-1ª at points near the Rua da Além.

Intermittent creeks and small seasonal streams bisect the parish., supporting the growth of various settlements and neighbourhoods, involved inagriculture, including (from west to east): Ribeira do Granjo, Ribeira do São Pedro and Ribeira de Fonte do Rego. Five bridges cross these water courses at São Pedro, Porceirão, Igreja, a second one in São Pedro (at the lower part of the parish) and Ponte Nova.

Bisected by these natural barriers, the parish developed in various nuclei associated with the roads and pathways that interconnected the pasturelands and woodlots along the flanks of the Cabeço Gordo volcano. Consequently, small neighbourhoods or communities developed along: the regional roadway (that included Feteira de Baixo, Caminho do Meio and Alto da Lajinha), another route that connected Feteira to Flamengos (that included Cruz da Portela, Caminho das Terças and Lameiro Grande), a second lateral road that included Farrobim do Sul and intersected the interior towards Flamengos (that included Cimo de São Pedro, Atalaia, Grotas, Fonte do Rego and Cimo do Granjo), and a roadway that bisected these arterials starting in Angústias (from Courelas, across Cruz da Portela, to Portela and Grotas, to Fonte do Rego).

Economy
Agriculture is the primary source of income. Historically, the parish has cultivated potatoes, supported orange and lemon orchards, as well as large quantities of wheat and corn. Most of these crops were cultivated for export, although small itinerant banana fields were cultivated for local consumption. These continue to important crops, but currently, the cattle and dairy industry is generally accepted as the primary source of agro-business (although some lambs are raised).

The fishery and paper industries have also supported the local economy.  Yet, economic difficulties, in particular regional politics, have seen a decrease in people participating in these activities, since 1862.

Architecture

Civic
 Hayloft on Rua das Courelas
 Residence on Estrada Regional E.R.1-1ª
 Residence on Rua da Engenhaira
 Residences on Rua da Igreja
 Residence/Shop on Rua da Igreja
 Residence on Rua das Courelas
 Ribeira da Granja Tidal Pool
 Rural Residence on Algar
 Twin Residences on Rua da Igreja
 Windmill of Algar
 Windmill of Cruz da Portela )

Religious
 Church of the Divine Holy Spirit
 Former Parish Rectory/Residence
There are approximately 37 impérios or religious structures to honour the Holy Spirit on the island, of these seven are located in the civil parish. Some, like the Império das Grotas in Feteira, date back to the 19th century (1898 specifically), have been susceptible to a change in the islands demographics, economics and agnosticism, and slowly abandoned due to local disinterest.

Culture
In addition to the feast days associated with the Holy Spirit, there are other religious and secular events that mark the annual calendar, including the feast day of Our Lady of Lourdes, which is held on the last weekend of August.

References

Parishes of Horta, Azores